Cuco Valoy  (born January 6, 1937, in Manoguayabo, Santo Domingo, Dominican Republic) is a Dominican Republic singer, songwriter, percussionist and guitarist, who is versatile in salsa, son montuno, guaracha and merengue. He began performing with his brother Martín, under the name Los Ahijados. Valoy is the father of Ramón Orlando, with whom he formed the band Los Virtuosos, later changed to La Tribu. He is widely known for the song "Juliana", which was covered by the group DLG; a cover that featured Valoy's vocals.

Discography
 1993: Bien Sobao/Y Lo Virtuoso (Kubaney)
 1993: Lo Mejor de Cuco Valoy (Kubaney)
 1993: Lo Mejor de Cuco Valoy, Vol. 2 (Kubaney)
 1995: Época de Oro (Kubaney)
 1996: Disco de Oro (Kubaney)
 2003: Gold (Edenways)
 2004: Intacto (Kubaney)
 2004: Grandes Soneros de la Época
 2007: Sonero y Valor
 2008: Reserva Musical
 2009: La Piedra

References

External links
 Biography of Cuco Valoy with performance videos
 Cuco Valoy, Biografía autorizada. Escrita por Jose Díaz.  (Julio 2021)
 Cuco Valoy: Afropop vocalist

1937 births
Living people
People from Santo Domingo
20th-century Dominican Republic male singers
21st-century Dominican Republic male singers
Merengue musicians
Latin Grammy Lifetime Achievement Award winners
Hispanic and Latino American musicians